Kapas is a district in Bojonegoro Regency, East Java, Indonesia. It borders Soko of Tuban Regency to the north, Balen to the east, Sukosewu to the south, and Bojonegoro to the west. The village of Sukowati is the petroleum exploration site of Joint Operating Body Pertamina PetroChina East Java (JOB-PPEJ) as a part of Tuban Block.

Administration
Kapas district is divided into 21 administrative villages.

Transport

Roads
Indonesian National Route 20 runs from Babat to Caruban through Kapas.

Railways
Kapas is served by Kapas railway station which has once daily commuter service to Surabaya Pasar Turi, Surabaya Gubeng and Sidoarjo. More commuter and intercity rail services are provided at Bojonegoro railway station.

References

Districts of East Java
Bojonegoro Regency